Beaumont Saint-Cyr is a commune in the department of Vienne, western France. The municipality was established on 1 January 2017 by merger of the former communes of Beaumont (the seat) and Saint-Cyr.

Population

See also 
Communes of the Vienne department

References 

Communes of Vienne